The livre parisis (Paris pound) was a standard for minting French coins and a unit of account. Like the livre tournois, which was divided into 20 sols tournois each of 12 deniers tournois, the livre parisis was also divided into 20 sols parisis each of 12 deniers parisis, but the livre parisis was worth 25 sols tournois (i.e., the livre tournois was worth  of the livre parisis). Each sol parisis was thus worth 15 deniers tournois, and each denier parisis worth  deniers tournois.

Before the seizure of the Anjou region around Tours by Philip II of France in 1203, the livre parisis had been the official coin of the Capetian dynasty.  The livre tournois quickly outstripped the livre parisis as a unit of account, and it ceased to exist as an actual coin under Louis IX.  Despite this, a monetary unit of accounting based on the livre parisis continued to be used in the area around Paris and was not officially abolished until 1667 by Louis XIV of France.

See also

 French livre

Modern obsolete currencies
Medieval currencies
1667 disestablishments in France
Economic history of the Ancien Régime